Matthew Farrelly (born 21 March 1990) is an Australian professional wrestler. He is currently signed to WWE, where he performs on the NXT brand under the ring name Grayson Waller. Before signing with WWE, he previously wrestled on the independent circuit under the ring name Matty Wahlberg. In addition, he was also a history teacher in his home state of New South Wales, and was also part of the Australian Survivor TV series.

Professional wrestling career

Independent circuit (2017–2021) 
On 15 April 2017, at a Newcastle Pro Wrestling event, Farrelly made his debut under the ring name Matty Wahlberg, losing to SnapChad. Wahlberg would form a tag team with Carter Deams, known as The BABES (Blonde And Blue Eyed Squad), managed by Harley Wonderland. Wahlberg then returned to singles competition and he would receive a PWA Heavyweight Championship match against Caveman Ugg, but lost to Ugg at the PWA Black Label: Wahlberg Vs. Ugg event in March 2019. At the PWA Black Label: Break Their Back & Make Them Rumble event, Wahlberg lost to TJ Perkins. At the PWA Black Label: Colosseum event, Wahlberg won the 2019 Colosseum tournament by defeating Chris Basso in the first round, Orange Cassidy in the semi-finals, and Travis Banks in the final. After the PWA Black Label: It Started Out With A Kiss event went off the air, Wahlberg addressed the live crowd, informing them that he was leaving PWA.

WWE (2021–present) 
On 14 March 2021, it was reported that Farrelly had signed with WWE. On 11 June episode of 205 Live, he made his WWE debut under the ring name Grayson Waller, defeating Sunil Singh. On 28 September episode NXT, Waller unsuccessfully challenged Roderick Strong for the NXT Cruiserweight Championship. On 9 November episode of NXT, he lost to Solo Sikoa in a triple threat match which also included LA Knight.

On 23 November episode of NXT, Waller berated the fans, thus turning heel. At NXT WarGames, he teamed up with Bron Breakker, Carmelo Hayes, and Tony D'Angelo as Team 2.0, where they defeated Team Black & Gold (Johnny Gargano, LA Knight, Pete Dunne, and Tommaso Ciampa) in a WarGames match. On the following episode of NXT, Waller brutally attacked Johnny Gargano during his farewell promo where he thanked his fans and friends, thus cementing his heel turn. On 21 December episode of NXT, he attacked Dexter Lumis after the latter's match and announces that he will dismantle the old NXT one by one, and he then confronted AJ Styles, whom he had criticized on social networks a few days before. At NXT: New Years Evil on 4 January 2022, Styles once again confronted Waller, resulting into a brawl between the pair. The following week, Waller lost to Styles. After the match, he was attacked by the returning LA Knight. On the February 1 episode of NXT, Waller, alongside his new "insurance policy" Sanga, interfered in Knight's match against Joe Gacy, causing Knight to lose the match. At NXT Roadblock on 8 March, Waller defeated Knight in a Last Man Standing match when he used Sanga to make it to his feet and beat the ten count.

At NXT Stand & Deliver, Waller failed to win the NXT North American Championship in a ladder match. Waller and Sanga would enter the tag team gauntlet match for the vacant NXT Tag Team Championship, where they were eliminated by the Creed Brothers. Waller then turned on Sanga and defeated him a week later on the 19 April episode of NXT. Waller then briefly feuded with the debuting Nathan Frazer, who he lost to at Spring Breakin'. Waller would then pursue the NXT North American Championship by tricking Carmelo Hayes into signing the contract. At NXT: The Great American Bash on 5 July, Waller lost to Hayes due to interference from Trick Williams and Wes Lee. Despite this, Waller blamed his loss on Wes Lee and defeated him on the 26 July episode of NXT due to interference from Williams. Waller then started a rivalry with Apollo Crews, defeating him on the 30 August episode of NXT after "injuring" his eye, but lost to him at Halloween Havoc in a casket match.

At NXT Deadline, Waller won the inaugural Iron Survivor Challenge to become the number one contender for Bron Breakker's NXT Championship. The match was later scheduled for NXT: New Year's Evil on 10 January 2023, where the match ended when the middle rope snapped, causing Waller to fall out of the ring and be counted out, allowing Breakker to retain the title. A Steel Cage match between the two for the title was subsequently scheduled for Vengeance Day on 4 February, where Waller again failed to win the title.

Other media 
In 2019, Farrelly appeared on Australian Survivor: Champions vs. Contenders 2. He competed on the Contenders team, and garnered attention for his outspoken personality, essentially playing a version of his Matty Wahlberg wrestling character on reality television. He would be eliminated from the competition after several weeks on the island.

Farrelly also made a cameo appearance on Young Rock in 2021, playing the role of Ric Flair.

Championships and accomplishments 
Future Wrestling Australia
FWA Heavyweight Championship (1 time)
Newcastle Pro Wrestling
Newy Pro Middleweight Championship (1 time)
King of the Castles (2018) – with Carter Deams
Pro Wrestling Australia
2019 PWA Colosseum Winner
Pro Wrestling Illustrated
Ranked No. 439 of the top singles wrestlers in the PWI 500 in 2021
Wrestling GO!
Wrestling GO! Silver Medal Championship (1 time)
Wrestling GO! 24/7 Watermelon Championship (1 time)
Wrestling Go! Year End Awards (3 times)
Male Wrestler of the Year (2018)
Match of the Year (2018) – 
Rivalry of the Year (2018) – 
WWE
 Men's Iron Survivor Challenge (2022)

References

External links 
 
 
 
 

1990 births
21st-century professional wrestlers
Australian expatriate sportspeople in the United States
Australian male professional wrestlers
Australian male television actors
Australian Survivor contestants
Expatriate professional wrestlers
Living people
Male actors from Sydney
Sportspeople from Sydney